Maligne Canyon is a slot canyon located in the Jasper National Park near Jasper, Alberta, Canada. Popular for sightseeing and exploration, the area contains waterfalls, underground stream outlets, birds and plant life.

Geology
While visually striking and unusual, slot canyons are a common occurrence within the northern Rocky Mountains. These canyons show the characteristic of Karst topography and is common in this region due to its easily soluble nature. Flowing out of Medicine Lake, the Maligne River flows about 15 kilometers upstream as a full size river, but as a losing stream, quickly disappears into seeps in the ground and completely vanishes from the surface not far from the lake for most of the year. The smaller streams that feed the valley below that point rebuild the river by the time it reaches the top of the canyon. The river drops down the canyon and intersects the bedrock layers where the underground river flows. Also at this point numerous large underground streams join and greatly amplify the flow. The canyon is constantly being eroded by the churning and swirling of the water. Limestone is one of the most dominant minerals within the canyon. It was deposited in a shallow tropical sea by plankton which secrete limestone.

References

External links 

Maligne Canyon in Winter
Explore Maligne Canyon
Jasper Adventures
All about Limestone
Maligne Canyon Trails

Jasper National Park
Canyons and gorges of Canada
Landforms of Alberta